The list of provincial parks of the Kootenays contains the provincial parks located within this geographic region of the province of British Columbia. It includes parks from the three regional districts of East Kootenay, Central Kootenay and Kootenay Boundary. These parks are administered by BC Parks under the jurisdiction of the Ministry of Environment and Climate Change Strategy.

List of parks

Gallery

External links 

Map of provincial parks in the Kootenays on env.gov.bc.ca

 
Provincial parks
British Columbia, Kootenays
Kootenays